

History
 From 1965–66 to present

Name and franchise changes
 La Salle changed its name to San Pedro in 1966–67.
 Honduras changed its name to Progreso in 1969–70.
 Verdún bought Atlético Español's franchise in 1971–72.
 Broncos bought Verdún's franchise in 1972–73.
 Universidad bought Broncos's franchise in 1982–83 and changed its name to Broncos UNAH.
 Broncos UNAH changed its name back to Universidad in 1983–84.
 Atlético Morazán changed its name to Juventud Morazánica in 1983–84.
 Sula bought Juventud Morazanica's franchise in 1985–86 and changed its name to Juventud de Sula.
 Juventud de Sula changed its name back to Sula in 1986–87.
 Tela Timsa changed its name to Petrotela in 1991–92.
 Real Comayagua bought Real Maya's franchise in 2001–02.
 Real Maya bought Real Comayagua's franchise in 2002–03.
 Real Maya changed its name to Real Patepluma in 2002–03 Clausura.
 Honduras Salzburg withdrew for 2003–04, thereby leaving Victoria, who had actually been relegated in 2002–03.
 Universidad changed its name to Broncos UNAH in 2006–07.
 Hispano bought Valencia's franchise in 2006–07.
 Atlético Gualala and Real Juventud merge and kept the name Real Juventud in 2009–10.
 Platense bought Necaxa's franchise in 2012–13.
 Infop RNP changed its name to Real De Minas in 2018–19.

Promotions and relegations by club
 As of April 2021

References

Liga Nacional de Fútbol Profesional de Honduras